The Plovdiv trolleybus system was a part of the public transport network of the city and municipality of Plovdiv, the second most populous city in Bulgaria.

Opened in December 1955, the system had waxed and waned in size over time.  As of the beginning of 2012, it was made up of only one route. There are current disputes between the  operator and the municipality regarding the validity of the trolleybus contract. Gradski Transport Plovdiv is still the operator of this type of transport, despite the numerous infractions of the contract since 2010. In October 2012, because the operator is a private company, the city lost the opportunity to acquire 65 mln lv EU funding for purchasing approximately 100 brand-new trolleybuses. The system was officially closed on 1 October 2012 although some trolleybuses continued operation for a few more weeks. Currently there is no trolleybus movement and the municipality has issued an order for dismantling the overhead network.

Services
The sole Plovdiv trolleybus line  was:

 3 ТК "Марица" (TC "Maritza") – ЕАЗ (EAZ)

Fleet

, the Plovdiv trolleybus fleet had 47 trolleybuses:

 ZiU-9 - 2 units;
 Škoda 14Tr - 23 units;
 Škoda 9Tr - 1 units;
 Van Hool AG280T - 11 units (ex-Ghent trolleybus system – imported 2009);
 Saurer / Hess GT560 - 10 units (ex-St. Gallen trolleybus system – imported 2009).

See also

Plovdiv Central railway station
List of trolleybus systems

References

External links

 
 

Plovdiv
Plovdiv
Plovdiv